Estádio José Gomes, informally known as Estádio da Reboleira, after its location, is the stadium of the Portuguese football team C.F. Estrela da Amadora and it has a capacity of 9,288.

References

Reboleira
Sports venues in Lisbon District
Sports venues completed in 1957